Louise Fiddes (born 26 March 2001) is a British Paralympic swimmer who competes in international level events. She is a world and European champion in breaststroke events.

References

External links
 
 

2001 births
Living people
Sportspeople from Welwyn Garden City
Paralympic swimmers of Great Britain
English female swimmers
Medalists at the World Para Swimming Championships
Medalists at the World Para Swimming European Championships
Swimmers at the 2020 Summer Paralympics
Medalists at the 2020 Summer Paralympics
Paralympic bronze medalists for Great Britain
Paralympic medalists in swimming
Swimmers at the 2022 Commonwealth Games
Commonwealth Games medallists in swimming
Commonwealth Games bronze medallists for England
British female medley swimmers
British female breaststroke swimmers
British female butterfly swimmers
S14-classified Paralympic swimmers
21st-century British women
Medallists at the 2022 Commonwealth Games